Grand Lake may refer to:

Lakes 
Canada
 Grand Lake (Nova Scotia)
 Grand Lake (Newfoundland and Labrador)
 Grand Lake (New Brunswick)
 Grand Lake (Nipissing), Ontario
 Grand Lake (Timiskaming), Ontario

China
 Taihu, literally Grand Lake

United States
 Grand Lake, a lake in Chicot County, Arkansas
 Grand Lake (Colorado)
 Grand Lake (Louisiana)
 Grand Lake (Michigan) in Presque Isle County
 Grand Lake (St. Louis County, Minnesota)
 Grand Lake (Ohio)
 Grand Lake (Oklahoma)

International
 East Grand Lake (part of the Chiputneticook Lakes)

Communities in the United States 
 Grand Lake, Colorado, a town
 Grand Lake, Oakland, California, a neighborhood
 Grand Lake, Louisiana, an unincorporated community in Cameron Parish

See also
 Grant Lake (disambiguation)